Isaac Peabody, known by his stage name PEABOD, is a hip-hop artist, singer-songwriter-producer from Seattle, Washington. PEABOD is signed to Centricity Music. He debuted his first mix-tape Healthy Snacks in 2018.

History 

Isaac Peabody began his career in 2014 as a folk singer/songwriter, independently releasing his EP, Steps. As a long time hip-hop fan, he began to write hip-hop tracks for fun. This soon turned into a full mixtape, Healthy Snacks, which he released independently in 2017 under the moniker PEABOD. The self produced, recorded, and engineered mixtape caught the attention of Centricity Music, who then signed PEABOD.
 Healthy Snacks was re-released by Centricity Music in June 2018.

PEABOD defines the genre of his music as happy hip-hop.

Discography

Albums 

 Healthy Snacks (2018)

Extended plays 

 Backpack (2019)
 Growing Up, Part 1 (2020)
 Growing Up, Part 2 (2022)
 Deep Cuts (2023)

As a Featured Artist 

 Right from the Start (by Andrew Robertson) (2018)
 So Low (by 5ive & Kyren Cyrill) (2020)
 GO! (by Tre' Mutava) (2021)

References

External links 

 

Musical groups from Tennessee
2004 establishments in Tennessee
Musical groups established in 2004